Derek Jacobi is an English actor of the stage and screen.

Film

Television

Theatre

References

External links

 
 
 "Jacobi, Sir Derek (George)", Who's Who 2008, A & C Black, 2008; online edition, Oxford University Press, December 2007. Retrieved 22 October 2008.

Male actor filmographies